Tirumalai is a work of Tamil Vaishnava literature written by Thondaradippodi Alvar, comprising 45 verses. Each of these verses is regarded in popular tradition to be a flower, woven together to produce a garland for Ranganatha, a form of the deity Narayana. It is part of the compendium of the hymns of the Alvars, the Naalayira Divya Prabandham. The verses of this work are often existential and indicative of regret, reflecting the sorrow of the author for not having spent more of time in the veneration of his deity, wondering if salvation lies ahead of him.

Hymns 
The first two hymns of this work are as follows:

See also 

 Tiruvasiriyam
 Thiruppavai
 Ramanuja Noorantati

References 

Naalayira Divya Prabandham
Tamil Hindu literature
Vaishnava texts